The 1923–24 season was the 4th official football season for Beşiktaş J.K. They played in the new İstanbul Football League, in the newly formed Turkish Republic. Beşiktaş played along with the 2 other "İstanbul Giants": Fenerbahçe S.K. and Galatasaray S.K. for the first time ever. Beşiktaş qualified for the playoffs, defeated Süleymanie S.K. in the semi finals and Galatasaray S.K. in the final, to become the first ever champion. It was the club's 4th official football championship. Beşiktaş also became the runner up in the first ever Istanbul Football Championship, losing to Harbiye S.K. 0-2.

Kit

Beşiktaş used their original black and white kit.

Season

İstanbul Football League
Beşiktaş, Galatasaray, Süleymaniye and Fenerbahçe qualified for the playoffs by finishing in the top 4.

Semi finals

Final

Turkish Football Championship
Beşiktaş also played Harbiye for the Turkish Football championship, but lost.

External links
http://www.angelfire.com/nj/sivritepe/5758/artlIST.html

Beşiktaş J.K. seasons
Besiktas